Larry C. Rafferty (born in Brooklyn, New York) is the founder and chief executive officer of Rafferty Capital Markets, LLC, an investment banking and brokerage services firm headquartered in Garden City, New York.

Early life 
Rafferty graduated from Fairfield University in 1964, where he was captain of the Fairfield Stags men's basketball team. He was drafted by the Philadelphia 76ers in the 16th round (106th overall) of the 1965 NBA Draft, though he never played in the NBA.

Career 
In 1987, Rafferty and Tim Cohane founded Cohane Rafferty Securities LLC, an investment bank specializing in the mortgage banking and financial institutions industries. Rafferty served as chief executive officer of the company until the business was sold to Lehman Brothers in 2002.

Rafferty is a long-standing member of the Fairfield University board of trustees and was honored for his contributions to the university with an Alumni Service Award in 2007.

References

External links
Rafferty Holdings, LLC

Year of birth missing (living people)
Living people
American chief executives of financial services companies
American investors
American men's basketball players
Fairfield University Dolan School of Business alumni
Fairfield Stags men's basketball players
Philadelphia 76ers draft picks